La ilegal (in English, "The Illegal One") is a 1979 Mexican drama film directed by Arturo Ripstein and written by Fernando Galiana, and starring Lucía Méndez, Pedro Armendáriz Jr., and Fernando Allende.

Plot
Claudia (Méndez) is in love with Felipe (Armendariz), by whom she becomes pregnant, and after Felipe's marriage proposal, Claudia agrees to go to the United States, where she gives birth to their child. However, he has not yet gotten a divorce from his estranged wife. After discovering the relationship, Felipe's wife sends thugs to rape Claudia and record the act on tape, to be able to accuse her of prostitution and send her to prison, but due to being undocumented she is deported instead and her son remains in the United States. Desperate, Claudia looks for a way to get the baby back.

Cast
 Lucía Méndez as Claudia Bernal
 Pedro Armendáriz Jr. as Felipe Leyva
 Fernando Allende as Gabriel Ramírez
 Cristina Moreno as Jennifer Leyva
 Gina Morett as Carmen Ortega (as Gina Moret)
 
 Carlos Castañón as Coyote
 Claudio Martínez as Luis
 Jorge Patiño as Don Tony
 Sally Kirkland as Betty, Don Tony's girlfriend
 Carlos Nieto as Detective
 Ray Stricklyn as Police officer
 Armando Duarte as Police officer
 Peter Jason as Police officer
 Scott Wilson as Police officer
 Danny Faircloth as Pornographer
 Morgan Stevens as Pornographer
 Duncan McLeod as Judge
 José Luis Moreno as Driver
 Martha Meneses as Young Mother
 César Córdoba as Lieutenant
 Bo Silver as Chief of Police
 César Sobrevals como Court interpreter

Production
The film was made during a time when movies featuring undocumented Mexican migrants (or "wetbacks") and Chicanos were in vogue, largely dedicated to cater to the Spanish-speaking U.S. market. The film has been described as a star vehicle for Lucía Méndez. The film's theme of migration to the United States was one of the few times Mexican director Arturo Ripstein stepped outside the strictly national framework of his filmography.

Reception

The film has been criticized as a "telenovela".

In Cinema of Solitude: A Critical Study of Mexican Film, 1967-1983, Charles Ramírez Berg called the film "evidently a quick-and-dirty commercial outing—a good indicator of the kind of work Nuevo Cine auteurs were forced to accept during the López Portillo sexenio." Ramírez Berg pointed out that in the film,“ "Claudia is exploited not by evil gringos, but by other Mexicans. [...] Impregnated and then duped into coming to the United States by a Mexican man who abandons her and steals her child, she is then violated and shamed by his Mexican wife, which leads to her deportation. Reentering the United States, despicable coyotes (Mexicans who help other Mexicans cross the border for a fee) try to force her into having sex with them. Most wetback films are cautionary tales about the dangers of traveling north; La ilegal, in contrast, depicts Mexicans' betrayal of one another." Ramírez Berg also points out with respect to the end of the film, in which the Mexican consul helps Claudia to recover her baby, that while it "provides a hopeful alternative (Mexicans helping each other)", "the film's inner contradictions mount up and reverse the implication of much of what the film has exposed", saying that "the consul's deus ex machina heroics effectively stand the film's critique on its head. Mexicans are not compromised by the failures of their own system but by el norte, which contaminates all who came into contact with it," and thus "La ilegal gets the Mexican state off scot-free. Only those who—like the consul—maintain their loyalty to Mexico will remain impervious to the evils of the United States. By again externalizing the problem and ignoring the state's culpability, La ilegal becomes yet another system-affirming fantasy."

References

External links

1979 drama films
Mexican drama films
1970s Spanish-language films
Films directed by Arturo Ripstein
Films about illegal immigration to the United States
1970s Mexican films